

Notes

1870 ballet premieres, List of
Lists of ballet premieres by year
Lists of 1870s ballet premieres